The Proclamation of Singapore is an annex of the Agreement relating to the separation of Singapore from Malaysia as an independent and sovereign state dated 7 August 1965 between the Government of Malaysia and government of Singapore, and an act to amend the Constitution of Malaysia and the Malaysia Act on 9 August 1965 signed by the Duli Yang Maha Mulia Seri Paduka Baginda Yang di-Pertuan Agong, and read on the day of separation from Malaysia, which was 9 August 1965, by Lee Kuan Yew, the first Singaporean prime minister.

Draft

The Proclamation of Singapore in Singapore

WHEREAS it is the inalienable right of a people to be free and independent.

AND WHEREAS Malaysia was established on the 16th day of September, 1963, by a federation of existing states of the Federation of Malaya and the States of Sabah, Sarawak and Singapore into one independent and sovereign nation.

AND WHEREAS it was also agreed by the parties to the said Agreement that, upon the separation of Singapore from Malaysia, the Government of Malaysia shall relinquish its sovereignty and jurisdiction in respect of Singapore so that the said sovereignty and jurisdiction shall on such relinquishment vest in the Government of Singapore.

AND WHEREAS by a Proclamation dated the ninth day of August in the year one thousand nine hundred and sixty-five the Prime Minister of Malaysia Tunku Abdul Rahman Putra Al-Haj Ibni Almarhum Sultan Abdul Hamid Halim Shah did proclaim and declare that Singapore shall on the ninth day of August in the year one thousand nine hundred and sixty-five cease to be a State of Malaysia and shall become an independent and sovereign state and nation separate from and independent of Malaysia and recognised as such by the Government of Malaysia.

Now I LEE KUAN YEW Prime Minister of Singapore, DO HEREBY PROCLAIM AND DECLARE on behalf of the people and the Government of Singapore that as from today the ninth day of August in the year one thousand nine hundred and sixty-five Singapore shall forever be a sovereign democratic and independent nation, founded upon the principles of liberty and justice and ever seeking the welfare and happiness of her people in a more just and equal society.

(Signed) LEE KUAN YEW Prime Minister of Singapore
Dated the 9th day of August, 1965.

The Proclamation of Singapore in Malaysia

In the name of God, the Compassionate, the Merciful. Praise be to God, the Lord of the Universe, and may the benediction and peace of God be upon Our Leader Muhammad and upon all His Relations and Friends.

WHEREAS Malaysia was established on the 16th day of September, 1963, by a federation of the existing states of the Federation of Malaya and the States of Sabah, Sarawak and Singapore into one independent and sovereign nation;

AND WHEREAS by an Agreement made on the 7th day of August in the year one thousand nine hundred and sixty-five between the Government of Malaysia of the one part and the Government of Singapore of the other part it was agreed that Singapore should cease to be a state of Malaysia and should thereupon become an independent and sovereign state and nation separate from and independent of Malaysia;

AND WHEREAS it was also agreed by the parties to the said Agreement that, upon the separation of Singapore from Malaysia, the Government of Malaysia shall relinquish its sovereignty and jurisdiction in respect of Singapore so that the said sovereignty and jurisdiction shall on such relinquishment vest in the Government of Singapore;

NOW in the name of God the Compassionate, the Merciful, I, TUNKU ABDUL RAHMAN PUTRA AL-HAJ IBNI ALMARHUM SULTAN ABDUL HAMID HALIM SHAH, Prime Minister of Malaysia, with the concurrence and approval of His Majesty the Yang di-Pertuan Agong of Malaysia, DO HEREBY DECLARE AND PROCLAIM that, as from the 9th day of August in the year one thousand nine hundred and sixty-five, Singapore shall cease to be a State of Malaysia and shall forever be an independent and sovereign state and nation separate from and independent of Malaysia, and that the Government of Malaysia recognises the present Government of Singapore as an independent and sovereign government of Singapore and will always work in friendship and co-operation with it.

(Signed) (TUNKU ABDUL RAHMAN PUTRA) Prime Minister of Malaysia
Dated this 9th day of August, 1965

See also

 Proclamation of Malaysia
 Singapore in Malaysia
 Independence of Singapore Agreement 1965
 Succession of states
 Vienna Convention on Succession of States in respect of Treaties

References

External links
 United Nations Treaty Series (UNTS): Agreement relating to the separation of Singapore from Malaysia as an independent and sovereign state

Declarations of independence
Singapore in Malaysia
Formation of Malaysia
Separatism in Malaysia
August 1965 events in Asia
1965 in Singapore
1965 documents
1965 in politics
Malaysia and the Commonwealth of Nations
Singapore and the Commonwealth of Nations